Perséides ("Perseids") is the fifth studio album by Canadian singer-songwriter Béatrice Martin, under her stage name of Cœur de pirate, released April 30, 2021. The album is composed of ten solo piano songs, and was inspired by her recovery from vocal cord surgery. Each track is named for a city in Quebec that influenced Martin's childhood.

The album was a Juno Award nominee for Instrumental Album of the Year at the Juno Awards of 2022.

Track listing

References

2021 albums
Cœur de pirate albums
Bravo Musique albums